Altwegg is a Swiss surname. Notable people with the surname include: 

Jeannette Altwegg (1930–2021), British figure skater
Kathrin Altwegg (born 1951), Swiss astrophysicist
Timon Altwegg (born 1967), Swiss classical pianist 

Surnames of Swiss origin